Rudolf Droz (born 9 January 1888, 27 November 1946) was a German international footballer. He was capped once for the German national team, in a friendly against Sweden on 18 June 1911.

References

1888 births
Year of death missing
Association football forwards
German footballers
Germany international footballers
BFC Preussen players